Sami Niku (born 10 October 1996) is a Finnish professional ice hockey defenceman currently playing with JYP Jyväskylä of the Liiga. Niku was selected by the Winnipeg Jets in the 7th round (198th overall) of the 2015 NHL Entry Draft.

Playing career
Niku made his Liiga debut playing with JYP Jyväskylä during the 2014–15 Liiga season.

Following the 2016–17 season with JYP, having played his first full season in the Liiga in posting 27 points in 59 games, Niku agreed to a three-year, entry-level contract with the Winnipeg Jets on May 15, 2017. He played most of the 2017–18 season with the Manitoba Moose, the Jets' American Hockey League (AHL) affiliate.  He was called up by the Jets on April 1, 2018, and scored his first goal in his NHL debut in a Jets' win over the Montreal Canadiens on April 3. At  conclusion of the 2017–18 regular season, Niku was voted as the AHL's top defenseman, as well as earning AHL First All-Star team and the AHL All-Rookie honours.

On 21 September 2021, Niku was bought out of his contract with the Jets. Three days later, he signed a one-year contract with the Montreal Canadiens. A week later, in his first pre-season game with the team, Niku sustained a concussion after being hit from behind by Ottawa Senators player Josh Norris and was ruled out indefinitely.

As a free agent from the Canadiens, Niku opted to return to Finland agreeing to re-join original club, JYP Jyväskylä of the Liiga, on a one-year contract for the 2022–23 season on 29 July 2022.

International play

Internationally, Niku played in the  2014 IIHF World U18 Championships, the 2015 World Junior Ice Hockey Championships, and the 2016 World Junior Ice Hockey Championships.

Career statistics

Regular season and playoffs

International

Awards and honors

References

External links

1996 births
Living people
Finnish ice hockey defencemen
JYP Jyväskylä players
Laval Rocket players
Manitoba Moose players
Montreal Canadiens players
People from Haapavesi
Winnipeg Jets draft picks
Winnipeg Jets players
Sportspeople from North Ostrobothnia